Screamers is a 2006 documentary film directed by Carla Garapedian, conceived by Peter McAlevey and Garapedian and produced by McAlevey. The film explores why genocides have occurred in modern day history and features talks from Serj Tankian, lead vocalist of the American alternative metal band System of a Down, whose grandfather is an Armenian genocide survivor, as well as from human-rights activist, journalist, and professor, Samantha Power, as well as various other people involved with genocides in Rwanda and Darfur. Screamers also examines genocide denial in current-day Turkey, and the neutral trend that the United States generally holds towards genocide.

Screamers is now shown in Armenian Youth organizations to explain and clarify the Armenian genocide, and raise awareness. Also, it is used to educate Armenians and others about the genocide.

Contributors
(in order of appearance)
 Samantha Power, Professor, Harvard University, Pulitzer prize-winning author, A Problem from Hell: America and the Age of Genocide
 Serj Tankian, Vocalist, System of a Down
 John Dolmayan, Drummer, System of a Down
 Daron Malakian, Guitarist, System of a Down
 Shavo Odadjian, Bassist, System of a Down
 Aram Hamparian, Armenian National Committee
 Stepan Haytayan, Grandfather of Serj Tankian, 96-year-old survivor of Armenian genocide
 Maritza Ohanesian, 100-year-old survivor of Armenian genocide
 Guy Simonian, Community Activist
 Michael Hagopian, Filmmaker, "Voices from the Lake", "Germany and the Secret Genocide", "The Forgotten Genocide"
 Verjin Mempreian, 96-year old survivor of Armenian genocide
 Greg Topalian, Freeman College, UK
 Henry Morgenthau III, Grandson of Henry Morgenthau, Sr., U.S. Ambassador to the Ottoman empire
 Lord Shannon, House of Lords
 Lord Avebury, House of Lords
 Baroness Cox, Deputy Speaker, House of Lords
 Charles Tannock, MEP, Conservative, European Parliament
 Tom Tsvann, Professor, Center for Holocaust and Genocide Studies Amsterdam
 Peter Galbraith, Former U.S. Senate Staff
 Vartkes Yeghiayan, "The Case of Soghomon Tehlirian" Author
 Sibel Edmonds, Former FBI translator
 Taner Akçam, Turkish historian and dissident
 Hrant Dink, Agos Newspaper, Istanbul. Assassinated by a Turkish nationalist shortly after the premiere of Screamers, in which he was interviewed about Turkish denial of the Armenian genocide.
 Appo Jabarian, Editor, USA Armenian Life Speaking at UCLA conference
 Ara Sarafian, Gomidas Institute
 Adam Schiff, U.S. Congressman
 Salih Booker, Africa Action

Response

Critical reaction
 Screamers generally received good to average reviews from critics. Metacritic assign it a score of 55 / 100 based on a weighted average of more than 10 newspaper reviews.
 Ken Hachikian, chairman of the Armenian National Committee of America, described the documentary as a "powerful contribution to the anti-genocide movement."

Awards
In 2006, Screamers won the AFI Audience Award for Best Documentary.

References

External links
Official website
 
 
 
 

American war films
Armenian-language films
Armenian genocide films
Documentary films about the Armenian genocide
Armenian genocide denial
System of a Down
Documentary films about the Rwandan genocide
Documentary films about the War in Darfur
Documentary films about genocide
2006 documentary films
2006 films
2000s English-language films
2000s American films